is a Japanese professional baseball infielder for the Tohoku Rakuten Golden Eaglesin Japan's Nippon Professional Baseball. He previously played for the Chunichi Dragons

Early career
Abe started playing rubber-ball baseball in elementary school and continued at junior high school.

He experienced victory in the Iwate Prefectural and Tohoku regional tournaments with his high school Ichinoseki Daiichi Senior High School but did not make an appearance at Koshien.

In his freshman year at Meiji University, Abe started on the bench while in his junior year he became a regular at third base. In Fall of his senior year he contributed to the school's first league victory in 15 years.

He was employed by Honda and did wiring work while playing baseball for the company team. In his second year with the company he made an appearance in the industrial league Japan championships.

On 22 October 2015, Abe was selected as the 5th draft pick for the Chunichi Dragons at the 2015 NPB Draft and on 26 November signed a provisional contract with a \50,000,000 sign-on bonus and a \10,000,000 yearly salary.

Professional career

2016-2018
On 11 August, Abe made his first team debut as a pinch-runner against the Tokyo Yakult Swallows in a 2-8 loss. He then hit his first home run and RBI on 14 September against the Yomiuri Giants at Nagoya Dome. From his debut, Abe stayed with the first team until the end of the season making 24 appearances with a .170 batting average filing in at short-stop, third and second base.

In 2017, Abe was able to play in 21 games with the top team while hitting a slash line of .244/.309/.333 on the farm over 85 games.

In 2018, Abe once again had a limited role playing mostly as a pinch-hitter and defensive replacement in 18 games with the top team while in the fall he started training to play in the outfield. His results on the farm were less impactful than the previous season hitting a clip of .212/.296/.318 with 5 homeruns over 82 games.

2019
From spring training, Abe was marked for a starting role alongside fellow utility Naomichi Donoue and appeared in the opening day line-up at of the 2019 season at second base. On the April 5, Abe hit his first homerun since his rookie season against the Tokyo Yakult Swallows. Abe was a UZR leader at second base for the Dragons leading the, batting .291 and a .742 OPS.

Career statistics

Bold indicates league leader; statistics current as of 29 September 2016

References

External links

Dragons.jp
NPB.jp

1989 births
Living people
Baseball people from Iwate Prefecture
Japanese baseball players
Nippon Professional Baseball infielders
Chunichi Dragons players
Tohoku Rakuten Golden Eagles players
People from Ichinoseki, Iwate